KENZ (94.9 MHz, "Power 94.9 / 101.9") is a commercial FM radio station licensed to Provo, Utah and serving the Salt Lake City metropolitan area.  It broadcasts a Top 40 - CHR radio format simulcast with 101.9 KHTB Ogden and is owned and operated by Cumulus Media.  The radio studios are located in South Salt Lake, near the I-15/I-80 interchange.

KENZ has an effective radiated power (ERP) of 48,000 watts.  The transmitter is on Lake Mountain in Saratoga Springs, Utah.

History

Adult contemporary (1981-19??) 

Starting in 1981, the station was known as KLRZ. While with those call letters, the station carried an adult contemporary format under the name "Color 95".

Top 40 (19??-19?? 
The station later flipped to CHR as KBNG.

New age (19??-1989) 
As KTOU ("The Touch") the station carried a new age music format.

Rhythmic top 40 (1989-199?)
The format lasted a few years before the station became “Hot 94-9” KZHT, and the format changed to Rhythmic Top 40 with a hybrid mix of Dance and Modern tracks.

Top 40 (199?-2003)
The station, as Top 40 “94-9 ZHT” was popular among youth along the Wasatch Front. KZHT moved up the dial to 97.1 FM in December 2003 taking over KISN-FM and maintained the Top 40 format.

Rock (2004-2013) 
The former KZHT became KHTB with a Rock format branded as “94-9 The Blaze" the following month on January 14, 2004. The reason for the move was primarily based on signal. The 94.9 transmitter is located on Lake Mountain south of Salt Lake, and west of Provo, while 97.1's transmitter is located on Farnsworth Peak.

In August 2008, Citadel acquired the frequency and "The Blaze" moved to 97.5 which was then the defunct KOAY. KHTB then became known as 94.9 Z-Rock, an active rock station going up against KXRK. Sister station KBER moved to classic rock at the same time. Citadel merged with Cumulus Media on September 16, 2011.

Alternative (2013-2015) 
On September 2, 2013, KHTB shifted to an alternative rock format, branded as "ALT 94.9".

Classic hip hop (2015-2017)
On September 4, 2015, 94.9 began simulcasting on KENZ as part of a format transfer. 94.9 and 101.9 simulcasted for the weekend, while directing listeners to the latter frequency. On September 8, 2015, at 5 PM, KHTB ended the simulcast with KENZ and switched to a classic hip hop format, branded as "94.9 The Vibe". On September 23, 2015, KHTB and KENZ swapped call letters.

Top 40 (2017-present) 
On January 25, 2017, at 4 p.m., KENZ flipped to Top 40/CHR, branded as "Power 94-9". The flip brings the format back to the 94.9 frequency for the first time in 13 years. Power’s lineup is Dallace Jade from 10am- 3pm, Rick Vaughn from 3pm- 7pm, Adam Bomb from 7pm - 10pm

Previous logos

References

External links

Contemporary hit radio stations in the United States
ENZ
Mass media in Salt Lake City
Cumulus Media radio stations
Radio stations established in 1983
1983 establishments in Utah